English musician George Ezra has released three studio albums, two extended plays, fifteen singles and thirteen music videos.

After releasing two EPs, Did You Hear the Rain? in October 2013 and Cassy O' in March 2014, Ezra rose to prominence with the release of his hit single "Budapest", which reached the top ten in numerous countries around the world, reaching number one in Austria, New Zealand and the Czech Republic.

Ezra's debut studio album Wanted on Voyage, which was released on 30 June 2014, reached number one in the UK and the top ten in seven other countries, including Australia. It was the third best-selling album of 2014 in the UK. The album also peaked at number 19 on the Billboard 200 charts in the United States. Ezra released six singles from the album: "Did You Hear the Rain?", "Budapest", "Cassy O'", "Blame It on Me", "Listen to the Man" and "Barcelona". Zane Lowe, then a BBC Radio 1 DJ, called him "one of the most compelling and powerful new vocalists around."

Ezra's second studio album, Staying at Tamara's, which was released on 23 March 2018 by Columbia Records, reached number one in the UK and the top ten in seven other countries, including Australia. It was accompanied by five singles: "Don't Matter Now", "Paradise", "Shotgun", "Pretty Shining People" and "Hold My Girl". "Paradise" reached number two on the UK Singles Chart.

In June 2018, Ezra gained his first UK number-one single with "Shotgun".

In late 2021, Ezra released "Come on Home for Christmas" as an Amazon exclusive. 

Ezra's third studio album Gold Rush Kid was released on 10 June 2022. Four singles from the album have been released: "Anyone for You (Tiger Lily)" in January 2022, "Green Green Grass" in April 2022, "I Went Hunting" in June 2022, and "Dance All Over Me" in September 2022.

Albums

Extended plays

Singles

Promotional singles

Other charted and certified songs

Music videos

Notes

References

External links
 
 

Ezra, George